Skorvebradden is a heavily crevassed ice slope extending about 13 miles east-southeast from Hamarskorvene Bluff, in the Muhlig-Hofmann Mountains, Queen Maud Land. Mapped by Norwegian cartographers from surveys and air photos by the Norwegian Antarctic Expedition (1956–60) and named Skorvebradden.

Ice slopes of Queen Maud Land
Princess Astrid Coast